Esther Schipper (born 1963) is a German art dealer and gallerist.

Early life
Schipper is the daughter of Dutch sinologist Kristofer Schipper. She was born in Taiwan and lived there until the age of seven. She later grew up in Paris.

Career
Schipper opened her first gallery in Cologne in 1989. Between 1990 and 1992, Schipper and Daniel Buchholz also operated Buchholz & Schipper, a shop specializing in multiples.

In 1995, Schipper opened a project space in Berlin, and moved all of its operations there in 1997. From 2010 until 2017, the gallery was located in a  space in the former offices of architect Arno Brandlhuber in Berlin's Tiergarten district. Following negotiations launched in 2014, Schipper acquired the majority shareholding in Jörg Johnen GmbH in 2015 and then took over both galleries’ business sides; the Johnen location eventually closed.

In 2017, Esther Schipper moved to a  space located inside a former printing facility and warehouse for the local Berlin newspaper Der Tagesspiegel on Potsdamer Strasse; the space was designed by Selldorf Architects. In 2021, the gallery had temporary spaces in Palma de Mallorca, Zhongshan District, Taipei and the Tianjin Free-Trade Zone. Since 2022, the gallery has been operating second location in Paris and a third showroom in a four-story building in Seoul's Itaewon neighbourhood, designed by StudioMDA.

Esther Schipper represents several living artists, including AA Bronson, Angela Bulloch, Thomas Demand, Simon Fujiwara (since 2018), Ryan Gander, Liam Gillick, Rodney Graham (since 2015), Pierre Huyghe, Ann Veronica Janssens, Gabriel Kuri, Jac Leirner (since 2020), Isa Melsheimer, Philippe Parreno, Anri Sala (since 2015), Tino Sehgal (since 2015), and Daniel Steegmann Mangrané (since 2015).

In addition to her work as a gallerist, Schipper was a member of the Art Basel art fair's selection committee for ten years and later joined the selection committee of Frieze Art Fair in New York.

Personal life
Schipper lives in Mitte, Berlin, with her partner Florian Wojnar and their two children.

References

External links

Living people
German art dealers
1960s births